Cory Black (born 19 October 1980) is a New Zealand cricket umpire. He has stood in domestic matches in the 2020–21 Plunket Shield season and the 2019–20 Ford Trophy. He also stood in domestic match in 2020–21 Super Smash.

He has stood as an umpire in international matches featuring the New Zealand women's cricket team.

References

External links
 

1980 births
Living people
New Zealand cricket umpires
Sportspeople from Southland, New Zealand